Bussac may refer to the following places in France:

Bussac-Forêt, in the Charente-Maritime département 
Bussac, in the Dordogne département